Robert Lee Sweet (born March 21, 1960) is the drummer of the Christian metal band Stryper. He and his brother Michael founded the band as Roxx or Roxx Regime. Robert became known as the "Visual Time Keeper" for his wild drumming and captivating drum kits. Unlike most drummers, Sweet faces in the direction of stage left or right while playing, not straight ahead, so that the audience can see him and not have their view of him obscured by his drumkit. He began using a sideways setup in 1978 as a way to enhance his showmanship and connect with the audience. Sweet also played a key role in the visual direction of the band itself as well as being a significant contributor to the group.

Sweet's interest in drumming began in early childhood. He cites a stop at a club during a trip to Las Vegas when he was 10 years old as a defining moment. A blue sparkle Ludwig drum set caught his attention and he "fell in love".

Sweet attended Pioneer High School in Whittier, California. During high school, instead of participating in a traditional school music program like marching band, he worked with the school's music director to put together a rock band. He is a self-taught drummer, honing his craft playing along with other drummers while developing his style at the same time. After high school he went to college to study music but left after a month.

At the age of 15, in April 1975, Sweet became a Christian, an outgrowth of a lifelong belief in God.

Post Stryper
After Stryper broke up in 1992, Sweet played in a variety of acts and projects largely Christian-oriented. He participated in the band King James with former Stryper bassist Tim Gaines and former Whitecross guitarist Rex Carroll, and toured with them until 1996. He also participated in other projects, such as Shameless and Titanic. Sweet recorded a solo album titled Love Trash which demonstrated an eclectic side of his writing and performing capabilities. Later, Sweet performed for a number of metal bands' albums including Blissed, Final Axe, Menchen (with guitarist Bill Menchen), Seventh Power, Subdux, and Dbeality as well as guest appearing on a few tracks for Titanic and the supergroups Shameless and 7 Hours Later.

Stryper reunion
Sweet played a key role in the reappearance of Stryper by taking part in 2000's "Stryper Expo" and a reunion show in Costa Rica.  The successful reception led Sweet to push for a reunion of the band which came in the form of a request by Hollywood Records for a new Best of collection.  The band decided that rather than doing another compilation, they would record two new songs and go on tour in support of the new release.  2003 saw Sweet tour with a re-formed Stryper that featured the departure of bassist, Tim Gaines, who was replaced by Tracy Ferrie.  In 2004, Stryper returned to the studio to begin working on its August 2005 release, Reborn, which marked the band's first full-length recording of original material in over 15 years, since 1990's Against the Law.  The Stryper Murder by Pride album, released July 2009, marked the first Stryper album Sweet did not record drums for, this position was filled by studio musician Kenny Aronoff. He did however play in Stryper's 25th Anniversary Tour in support of the album. Sweet has appeared on every Stryper album since.

Influence
 Mike Portnoy of Dream Theater, Avenged Sevenfold, and a host of other bands, who was also named "Best Drummer" by Modern Drummer magazine, stated in an interview that Sweet was one of his favorite drummers.
Joey Cassata of the band ZO2 and the TV show Z Rock names Sweet as one of his influences describing him as "one of the all-time great rock drummers."
 Troy Adcox of the Dallas-based Christian rock, praise and worship band Lucid Dreamer lists him as one of his six influential drummers.
 Robert Hernandez, Jr., of the band Blacklight from San Antonio, Texas named Sweet as a favorite drummer.
 In an undated interview, Marc Anthony, drummer for the Raleigh, NC-based band Widow, identified Sweet as his second most influential drummer.
 Gustavo Muñoz of Disdente expanded his drumming technique by playing along with Sweet, one of his favorite drummers.

Equipment
As of September 2019, Sweet endorses Yamaha drums (previously Crush drums), Stagg Cymbals, SKB Cases, Regal Tip by Calato Metal X wood tip drumsticks, Kickport, May acoustic drum miking system, Solomon Design mics, Aquarian Drumheads, Affliction clothing, Ahead drum gloves, and Trick drums.

Discography

Solo
2000: Love Trash

Final Axe
2006: The Axe Of The Apostles
2010: Beyond Hell's Gate Collector's Edition

Menchen
2008: Red Rock
2011: In The Light

Seventh Power
2006: Seventh Power
2008: Dominion & Power

Guest appearances
1989: First Watch, Guardian (backing vocals on "Hyperdrive")
1996: X'd Out, Out There, Ken Zehner (producer and drums)
1999: Backstreet Anthems, Shameless (drums on "Just 1 Night" and "What's Goin' On")
2003: It's About Time, 7 Hours Later (drums on "Perfect")
2010: Maiden Voyage (Collectors Edition), Titanic (drums on "Don't Care", "Freak Show", and "Suicide Doctor"; the original recording featured a drum machine)

Other works
1994: King James, King James
2002: Waking Up the Dead, Blissed
2002: Subdux One, Subdux
2003: It's About Time, 7 Hours Later
2005: Dbeality, Dbeality

References

External links
Interview with NewReleaseTuesday.com
Interview with DrummerConnection.com - October 2009

1960 births
American Christians
Living people
American heavy metal drummers
American performers of Christian music
Stryper members
20th-century American drummers
American male drummers
20th-century American male musicians